Zürich Hauptbahnhof (often shortened to Zürich HB, or just HB; Zürich Main Station or Zürich Central Station) is the largest railway station in Switzerland. Zürich is a major railway hub, with services to and from across Switzerland and neighbouring countries such as Germany, Italy, Austria, and France. The station was originally constructed as the terminus of the Spanisch Brötli Bahn, the first railway built completely within Switzerland. Serving up to 2,915 trains per day, Zürich HB is one of the busiest railway stations in the world. It was ranked as the second best European railway station in 2020.

The station can be found at the northern end of the Altstadt, or old town, in central Zürich, near the confluence of the rivers Limmat and Sihl. The station is on several levels, with platforms both at ground and below ground level, and tied together by underground passages and the ShopVille shopping mall. The Sihl passes through the station in a tunnel with railway tracks both above and below.

The station is included in the Swiss Inventory of Cultural Property of National Significance.

Another railway station, Letten, is out of service since 1989.

History

The first station 

It occupied a piece of land between the rivers Limmat and Sihl, and trains accessed it from the west via a bridge over the Sihl. At the eastern end of the station was a turntable, used for turning locomotives. This basic terminal station layout, with all trains arriving from the west, was to set the basic design of the station for the next 143 years.

The new station was the initially the terminus of the Swiss Northern Railway, more often called the Spanisch-Brötli-Bahn, which opened on 9 August 1847 and linked Zürich with Baden.

From the opening of the station, the railways of northern Switzerland developed rapidly, and by 1853 the Swiss Northern Railway had been merged into the Swiss Northeastern Railway (Schweizerische Nordostbahn; NOB). Also in 1853, the tracks in the station were regauged to the standard gauge that is still used by all lines in the station.  In 1856, the NOB completed its line from the station to Winterthur via the Wipkingen Tunnel and Oerlikon. In 1858, the NOB completed its line from Baden via Brugg to Aarau, where it connected with the Swiss Central Railway (Schweizerische Centralbahn; SCB), thus providing connections to Basel, Solothurn and Lausanne.

With further railways planned, it became clear that the 1847 station was not large enough. A rebuild was started to meet Zürich's increased transport needs, albeit on the same site and using the same basic layout.

The 1871 station 

In 1871, the replacement station building opened, to a design by architect . Its main entrance is a triumphal arch facing the end of the then newly built Bahnhofstrasse. In front of the arch stands a monument to the railway pioneer Alfred Escher.  The magnificent sandstone neo-Renaissance building features richly decorated lobbies and atriums, restaurants and halls. Originally housed inside it was the headquarters of the Schweizerische Nordostbahn (NOB). The train shed, spanned by iron trusses, initially covered six tracks. Its stone walls with arches and arched windows portrayed a simple, monumental impression of space.

The station was named Zürich Hauptbahnhof in 1893, to reflect that year's incorporation of many of Zürich's suburbs into an enlarged municipality.  In 1902, the year in which the Swiss Federal Railways (SBB) took over the Schweizerische Centralbahn and the NOB, the tracks inside the eastern end of the train shed were lifted, due to a lack of space.  Since then, these tracks have terminated at a more central location, immediately to the north of the Bahnhofstrasse.  Also in 1902, four more tracks and a north wing with a restaurant and railway mail service were added to the north of the train shed.  In the vacant space left inside the train shed, new rooms were built for baggage handling.

On 18 February 1916, the SBB decided that electrification of its network would be by the high-tension single-phase alternating current system that is still used on all routes. On 5 February 1923, the electrified Zug–Zürich railway was put into operation, the first electrified line to Zurich. By 1927 all routes from Zürich Hauptbahnhof had been electrified.

In 1933, the station's simple concourse and the iron and glass train shed were created with seven and a half arches to cover 16 tracks. As part of that work, the main shed was shortened by two segments.

In the 1940s, the line between Zürich and Geneva served as a "parade route".  The first lightweight steel express train had entered service on this route in 1937. By 11 June 1960, the SBB network was largely electrified. In the following year, the SBB introduced its first four-system electric trains under the Trans Europ Express banner, and thereby increased the Zürich Hauptbahnhof's international importance.

In 1963, about 500 metres before the concourse, an imposing six-storey concrete cube arose in the station yard. It was designed by SBB architect , and it has been the home of the Zentralstellwerk Zürich (central signalling control) since 1966.  The then state-of-the-art relay-controlled interlocking system replaced the decentralised mechanical and electro-mechanical signal boxes in the station throat, including the Stellwerk «Seufzerbrücke» ("Bridge of Sighs" signal box), which had spanned the entire station throat just east of the Langstrasse.

The signalling control system was modernised to coincide with the commissioning of the Zürich S-Bahn.  It is equipped with a computerised controller that performs the standard operations.  Apart from the tracks and points (switches) of the "Sihlpost station" (which are controlled by an electronic control system), the entire control of the points and signals in the Langstrasse–Concourse section is still largely under relay control, in some cases with the original relay sets installed in 1966.

The immense station yard, with its platform tracks and station building, is a bottleneck for the city of Zürich. The Limmat and the Sihl were further bottlenecks, and the combination of the three led to gridlock in the 1950s and 1960s. In parallel, there were plans for a subway system. Although the people voted against it in 1962, the city's Civil Engineering Department had already started to convert the Bahnhofplatz for the purpose of a possible underground line.

ShopVille and S-Bahn 

On 1 October 1970, construction of the Bahnhofplatz, as well as the pedestrian and shopping arcade ShopVille was completed. Upon its opening, the Bahnhofplatz became a pedestrian-free zone, and the underground ShopVille the only access to the station. Contrary to expectations, ShopVille did not capture the support of the people, who, in 1973, voted even more emphatically to reject a subway system.

In the 1980s, ShopVille became a drug-dealing hub, due to its proximity to the Autonomen Jugendzentrum Zürich ("Autonomous Youth Center Zürich"). Its low point was reached at the end of the decade, when travellers avoided all parts of it other than the concourse and the tram stop. Consequently, there were several night-time closures by mesh fences. However, the solution to this problem was foreseeable, as the people had agreed on 29 November 1981 to the construction of the Zürich S-Bahn and the extension of the Sihltal Zürich Uetliberg Bahn to the Hauptbahnhof.

This new line continued through the Zürichberg Tunnel to Stettbach, with connections to the existing lines to Dietlikon and Dübendorf. In the Hauptbahnhof, two underground stations were constructed. For the S-Bahn, a four-track station with the working title Museumstrasse was built, and the Sihltal Zürich Uetliberg Bahn was extended to the  station, which had once been intended for the never-realized U-Bahn.

The opening of the S-Bahn was on 27 May 1990, and since then, the ShopVille arcades have connected the two underground stations with the main hall. Black and white striped marble walls and granite floors are the main design features of what is one of the largest shopping centres in Switzerland. In 1996, the main hall was cleared of its temporary installations. In 1997, the train shed was fitted on both sides with pitched roofs on sloping concrete supports, designed by local architects Marcel Meili and Markus Peter.

Löwenstrasse station 

The planning of the S-Bahn and the Rail 2000 long-haul project raised the idea of building the Weinberg Tunnel, a through route from Zürich Hauptbahnhof to Oerlikon. That proposal was initially postponed, but the great success of the S-Bahn led to an expansion of services and, consequently, to capacity constraints.  Plans were made to expand existing rail lines within Zürich leading to the north, but this encountered resistance from the population living near those rail lines.  As an alternative the construction of the Weinberg tunnel and four additional underground tracks in the railway station was suggested and confirmed by a referendum.

In 2002, an architectural competition was held for the new Löwenstrasse transit station, won by the architect . On 22 December 2006, the Federal Office of Transport approved the building of the tunnel and a third underground four-track Löwenstrasse station.  In September 2007, construction began on the project, nicknamed "Durchmesserlinie" (cross-city link). On 14 June 2014, the new platforms and tunnels were opened.

The new line runs from the Altstetten railway station, crosses the Zürich HB station throat on a bridge, and leads into the underground Löwenstrasse station. It then ends at the level of the portals of the existing Wipkinger Tunnels in Oerlikon, where it connects with the northbound lines, including the line to Zürich Airport and Winterthur.

In 2007, the SBB and Deutsche Bahn entered into a station partnership between the Zürich HB and the Berlin Hauptbahnhof to promote knowledge sharing between operators of similarly sized stations.

Layout and facilities

Layout 

The station is aligned approximately east to west, at the northern edge of the city centre and the northern end of Bahnhofstrasse, the city's main shopping street. It is split over three principal levels, with the ground level housing sixteen terminal platform tracks and the station's main concourse. Below this level are a series of pedestrian passageways, the ShopVille shopping centre, and the course of the Sihl river. At the lowest level, and parallel to the terminal platforms at ground level, are ten underground platform tracks, of which two are terminal and eight are through.

The station's main concourse itself comprises two sections. To the east is the Haupthalle (Main Hall), which was the train hall of the 1871 station but is now a pedestrian circulation space. The Haupthalle is surrounded on three sides by station buildings, whilst to the west it opens onto the Querhalle (Cross Hall), which stretches across the head of the ground level terminal platforms. These platforms, comprising two side platforms and seven island platforms, are sheltered by the 1933-built train shed and are served by tracks numbered 3 to 18.

At the middle level, the station site is crossed north to south by four pedestrian passageways. The eastern three of these, the Passage Bahnhofstrasse, the Passage Löwenstrasse and the Passage Gessnerallee, form an interconnected complex with the ShopVille shopping complex and give direct access to all the station's platforms as well as to the surrounding streets. An intermediate underground level, immediately below the Haupthalle, connects these passageways with the concourse. The westernmost passage, the Passage Sihlquai, lies to the west of the Sihl, which passes under the station from north to south at the same level as the passageways. Because of the presence of the river channel, the Sihlquai passage has no direct connection to the other passageways, but it connects to streets to the north and south of the station, and to all platforms except that serving tracks 21 and 22.

At the lowest level, there are three groups of underground platforms. The most southerly are terminal tracks 21 and 22 of the  station, with a single island platform, and accessible only to trains on the SZU's Uetliberg and Sihltal lines. To the north of these are two island platforms serving tracks 31 to 34, known as the Löwenstrasse station, which link to the station's western rail approaches, and to an eastern approach via the Weinberg tunnel from Oerlikon station. Some distance to the north of these are two further island platforms serving tracks 41 to 44, known as the Museumstrasse station, which also link to the station's western approaches, and to an eastern approach via the Hirschengraben Tunnel from Stadelhofen station.

Facilities 

Underneath the Bahnhofplatz and the station is the large underground shopping centre called "ShopVille" of over 200 shops or other businesses. It benefits from the Swiss employment law rule that while generally labour on Sundays is not allowed, it is allowed in "centres of public transport". The huge underground "Rail City" is, therefore, usually bustling on Sundays even while the streets of Zurich are largely empty.

Events take place regularly in the Haupthalle, including "open air" cinema; vegetable, flea and Christmas markets; and events such as skating, beach volleyball and the "warm up" for the Street Parade.

Since 8 June 2009, Zürich HB has been the site of the first SBB Lounge. This waiting room was exclusively for holders of a first-class general subscription or a valid international first-class ticket or for frequent traveller program members of the Railteam partner railways.  However, the lounge was closed in 2016.

The station also has its own chapel, jointly run by the Evangelical Reformed and the Roman Catholic churches, but open to travellers of all denominations or religions. The chapel is located on the intermediate underground level, immediately below the Haupthalle.

Station bells, clock and lights 
There are station bells above the rear exit of the large hall. In the 1847 station, bells rang before each departure of the Spanisch-Brötli-Bahn. The signal order prescribed as follows: "10 minutes before the departure of a train, one [bell]; 5 minutes before the same, two [bells]; and immediately prior to departure, three bells". For the 1871 renovations, the architect Jakob Friedrich Wanner gave the station clock the place of honour in the portal above the main entrance, and the bells were placed in a small tower in the east facade.

On 12 September 2006, to commemorate the station's 150th anniversary, the ETH Zürich installed the NOVA, a three-dimensional, bivalent display, which consists of 25,000 individually addressable light balls. It represents a play of light of several colours, but can also represent cinematic sequences. It is expected to remain hanging in the station until further notice.

Operation 

Zürich HB is served by more than 2,900 trains daily. In 2018, it had an average of 471,300 passengers each working day. The station is busy at all times, with trains running from 05:00 until 01:00 during the week. From Friday night to Sunday morning, trains run all day and all night as part of the ZVV Nachtnetz (night network).

Tracks 
The station has four distinct groups of tracks, giving a total of 26 tracks:

 Tracks 3 to 18 are terminal tracks located at ground level, served by two side platforms and seven island platforms. These are used by long-distance trains from throughout Switzerland, and by international trains such as the EuroCity, Cisalpino, InterCityExpress and TGV.
 Tracks 21 and 22 are underground terminal tracks, served by a single island platform, and located on the southern side of the station.
 Tracks 31 to 34 are underground through tracks, served by a pair of island platforms, and located just to the north of tracks 21 and 22. These are used by long-distance and S-Bahn trains running to and from Oerlikon station via the Weinberg Tunnel. 
 Tracks 41 to 44  are underground through tracks, served by a pair of island platforms, and located on the northern side of the station. These are used by S-Bahn trains running via the Hirschengraben Tunnel and Zürich Stadelhofen station.

International services 
The following international services call at Zürich Hauptbahnhof:

 TGV Lyria: five round-trips per day over the Zürich–Baden line to Paris-Lyon.
 EuroCity:
 Transalpin: Single round-trip per day over the Zürich–Winterthur line to Graz Hauptbahnhof.
 Six round-trips per day over the Zürich–Winterthur line to München Hauptbahnhof.
 Single round-trip per day over the Zürich–Baden line to Hamburg-Altona.
 InterCity: Hourly service over the Zürich–Winterthur railway to Stuttgart Hauptbahnhof.
 Railjet Express: Four round-trips per day over the Lake Zürich left-bank line to Vienna, Budapest, or Bratislava. 
 Nightjet / EuroNight:
 Overnight train over the Lake Zürich left-bank line to Graz, Vienna, Prague, Budapest, or Zagreb.

Domestic long-distance traffic 
The following long-distance services call at Zürich Hauptbahnhof:

 InterCity:
 Hourly service over the Zürich–Baden and Lake Zürich left-bank lines between Basel SBB and Chur.
 Hourly service over the Zürich–Baden line to Lausanne.
 InterRegio:
 Hourly service over the Lake Zürich left-bank line to Chur.
 Hourly service over the Zürich–Baden and Zürich–Winterthur lines between Basel SBB and Zürich Airport.
 Two trains per hour over the Zürich–Baden line to Bern.
 Hourly service over the Zürich–Baden line to Basel SBB.
 Half-hourly service over the Lake Zürich left-bank line to Lucerne.
 RegioExpress:
 Hourly service over the Zürich–Baden line to Schaffhausen.

S-Bahn services 

Since the commissioning of the Zürich S-Bahn in May 1990, the Hauptbahnhof has been the central node of the Zürich S-Bahn Stammnetz (core network). As such, it is the nodal point where S-Bahn lines S2, S3, S5, S6, S7, S8, S9, S12, S14, S15, S16, S19, S20, S21, S24 and S25, the Sihltal Zürich Uetliberg Bahn (S4 and S10) and Zürich trams interconnect.

Urban public transport 
Around the station, the trams and trolleybuses of the Verkehrsbetriebe Zürich (VBZ) provide local public transport services. The Hauptbahnhof is one of the most important nodes of the Zürich tramway network.

The main station is accessible from five tram and bus stops:
Sihlpost|HB 300m to the south-west from exit Europaallee via the most western underpass, tram lines ,  and trolleybus .

Train operations 
Due to its central location in Switzerland and in Europe, the station was quickly able to establish itself as an important railway junction. Most trains running through several European countries operated through Switzerland. In addition, a majority of Swiss mainline trains travelled to or from Zürich. For the clock-face timetable introduced to Switzerland in 1982, Zürich is the "pacemaker". Delays and other disruptions at Zürich Hauptbahnhof sometimes affect the whole of Switzerland.

Long-distance trains meet in Zürich on the hour and half-hour, and thus connect with each other. In cases of delays, connecting trains wait a maximum of 3 minutes beyond the scheduled departure time, except for some international trains and the late night trains. S-Bahn services do not wait for late connecting trains, but the long-distance trains - contrary to popular opinion - usually wait for delayed S-Bahn trains (also for a maximum of 3 minutes).

Flood risk 
The Sihl passes through the station in a tunnel, with platforms above and below the river, and public circulation areas to either side. This limits the river's flow capacity, raising concerns about the capacity of the tunnel to deal with extreme flood events. Additionally, during the building of the new Löwenstrasse platforms, it was necessary to temporarily close part of this tunnel, thus reducing the capacity even further.

This threat has led the City of Zürich to develop, publish and test evacuation plans for the affected areas of the city, and especially the station area.

Customs
Zurich main station is, for customs purposes, a border station for passengers arriving from Germany. As such, customs checks may be performed in the station by Swiss customs officials. Systematic passport controls were abolished however, when Switzerland joined the Schengen Area in 2008.

See also

History of rail transport in Switzerland
Rail transport in Switzerland

References

Notes

Further reading

Books

Article

External links 

 Station data from SBB web site
 Interactive station plan (Zürich HB)
 Station plan (Zürich HB) (PDF, 6.8 MB) 
 ShopVille RailCity Zürich pages (PDF, 4.5 MB)

Hauptbahnhof
Buildings and structures completed in 1871
Cultural property of national significance in the canton of Zürich
 HB
Sihl
Swiss Federal Railways stations
Railway stations located underground
19th-century architecture in Switzerland
Railway stations in Switzerland opened in 1871